Pristidactylus achalensis, the Argentine anole, is a species of lizard in the family Leiosauridae. The species is endemic to Argentina.

References

Naretto, S.; Cabezas Cartes, F.; López Juri and M. Chiaraviglio. 2022. Intraspecific variability of bite force in in Achala copper lizards in a sexual selection context: who bites harder and when and why? Biological Journal of Linnean Society, 136, 2: 282-292. https://doi.org/10.1093/biolinnean/blac034

Torres, M.d.M.; Viladrich, L and S. Naretto. 2021. Role of colouration in antipredator strategies of Pristidactylus achalensis (Squamata: Leiosauridae) related to sex and predatory stages. Biological Journal of Linnean Society, 133(3) 896 – 909. https://doi.org/10.1093/biolinnean/blab012

Viladrich, L; Torres, M.d.M. and S. Naretto. 2021. ¿Es importante el color de los machos de lagarto de Achala (Pristidactylus achalensis) para la elección de pareja? Cuadernos de Herpetologia, 35 (1). http://sedici.unlp.edu.ar/handle/10915/120183

Naretto, S. and M. Chiaraviglio. 2020. Factors driving sexual dimorphism and colour variability in the Achala Copper Lizard (Pristidactylus achalensis), an endemic species to the highland mountains in central Argentina. Canadian Journal of Zoology, 98: 377-389. http://dx.doi.org/10.1139/cjz-2019-0293

Torres, M.dM.; Viladrich, L. and Naretto, S. 2019. A case of cannibalism in Achala copper lizard Pristidactylus achalensis, an endemic lizard to the highest mountain areas in Central Argentina (Squamata: Leiosauridae). Herpetology Notes, 12, 827-828. https://www.biotaxa.org/hn/article/view/50296

Blengini, C.; Lopez Juri, G.; Unates, D.R.; Chiaraviglio, M. and S. Naretto. 2020. Sperm parameters in Pristidactylus achalensis (Squamata: Leiosauridae), lizard endemic to the highest mountain areas in Central Argentina. Copeia, 108(3): 528-544. https://doi.org/10.1643/CH-19-310

Pristidactylus
Reptiles of Argentina
Reptiles described in 1964
Taxa named by José María Alfonso Félix Gallardo